Flash-Ball is a registered trademark for a less-lethal hand-held projectile launcher developed by French hunting firearms manufacturer Verney-Carron. Flash-Ball is intended to be used by riot police as an alternative to lethal firearms, bean bag rounds, and plastic bullets.

Characteristics 
The weapon exists in two versions of caliber 44/83. The super-pro version features vertically stacked barrels and is made from metal alloys, while the compact version is made from lighter composite materials with the twin barrels side by side. Both versions of the weapon can be used to fire a variety of ammunition although a soft 44 mm rubber ball is the most common.

According to the manufacturer's own publicity, the Flash-Ball's standard round packs the stopping power of a .38 (9 mm) caliber handgun but considerably less kinetic energy per square centimeter, making it unlikely to penetrate the body of a normally clothed person even at ranges down to 5 meters.

This said, various human rights groups have expressed fears that the widespread deployment of such weapons could result in police being less likely to apply de-escalation tactics when dealing with potentially dangerous situations.

Safety concerns 
Numerous eye losses, comas, and brain traumas as well as major bone breakages and one death due to cardiac arrest have been attributed to the use of Flash-Ball by police.

Users 
 : Law enforcement in France
 : Grupo de Operações Especiais (Special Operations Group) of Macau Police
 : Public Security Police

See also
Blast ball

References

External links
 

Multiple-barrel firearms
Police weapons
Riot guns
Firearms of France